Kepong Baru (甲洞卫星市) is a suburb in Kepong, Kuala Lumpur, Malaysia. It is located between Bandar Menjalara, Taman Usahawan and Segambut. There will be one metro station at Kepong Baru after 2021, named Kepong Baru station.

References

Suburbs in Kuala Lumpur